The General Federation of Ship Building Workers' Unions (Zosensoren) was a trade union representing workers in the shipbuilding industry in Japan.

The union was established in 1951.  It was affiliated with the Japanese Federation of Labour, and by 1958 had 28,462 members.  Next, it became affiliatedwith the Japanese Confederation of Labour, and by 1967 had grown to 58,344 members.

The union was keen on merging with smaller competitors.  In 1972 it achieved this, when it joined the new Japan Confederation of Shipbuilding and Engineering Workers' Unions.

References

Shipbuilding trade unions
Trade unions established in 1951
Trade unions disestablished in 1972
Trade unions in Japan